QuickBus or "qb" may refer to the following Maryland Transit Administration bus routes:

Route 40, operating from Woodlawn to Middle River
Route 46, operating from Cedonia to Paradise
Route 47, operating from Walbrook Junction to Overlea
Route 48, operating from Towson to Downtown Baltimore